Mother__! Mother__!! is a 1980 album by Clark Terry featuring Zoot Sims, of a jazz symphony composed by Charles Schwartz. Terry and Sims are accompanied on the album by an octet, the Contemporary Chamber Ensemble and the soprano Joan Heller.

Reception

Ken Dryden reviewed the album for Allmusic and wrote that "Although Terry is in great form, the music will be rather challenging for most fans of Terry's jazz recordings to enjoy, and Heller's vocals prove to be more of a distraction than a complementary factor. The front cover is unusually bland for Pablo, filled with the composer's liner notes instead of photos from the studio session. ...this record is worth picking up if found at a reasonable price by serious fans of Clark Terry, but the typical jazz listener can safely bypass this release."

Track listing 
 First Movement: "Celebration" – 8:52
 Second Movement: "Jubilation" – 11:15
 Third Movement: "Exultation" – 7:12
 Fourth Movement: "Revelation" – 9:55

All compositions by Charles Schwartz.

Personnel 
 Donald Palma – double bass
 Christopher Finckel – cello
 Anand Devandra  -clarinet
 Arthur Weisberg – conductor
 Clark Terry – flugelhorn, trumpet, vocals
 Susan Palma-Nidel – flute
 Gilbert Kalish – keyboards
 Anthony Cinardo, Raymond DesRoches – percussion
 Zoot Sims – soprano saxophone, tenor saxophone
 Jimmy Maxwell – trumpet
 Jean Ingraham – violin
 Joan Heller – vocals
 Norman Granz – producer

References

1980 albums
20th-century symphonies
Albums produced by Norman Granz
Clark Terry albums
Instrumental duet albums
Pablo Records albums